The Grand Chessboard: American Primacy and Its Geostrategic Imperatives (1997) is one of the major works of Zbigniew Brzezinski. Brzezinski graduated with a PhD from Harvard University in 1953 and became Professor of American Foreign Policy at Johns Hopkins University. He was later the United States National Security Advisor from 1977 to 1981, under the administration of President Jimmy Carter.

Regarding the landmass of Eurasia as the center of global power, Brzezinski sets out to formulate a Eurasian geostrategy for the United States. In particular, he writes that no Eurasian challenger should emerge that can dominate Eurasia and thus also challenge U.S. global pre-eminence.

Much of Brzezinski's analysis is concerned with geostrategy in Central Asia, focusing on the exercise of power on the Eurasian landmass in a post-Soviet environment. In his chapter dedicated to what he refers to as the "Eurasian Balkans", he uses Halford J. Mackinder's Heartland Theory.

The book was critically reviewed by The New York Times, Kirkus Reviews, Foreign Affairs, and other publications.

See also
 Foundations of Geopolitics
 American imperialism
 Geopolitics
 The Great Game
 Unholy Wars
 Secret Affairs: Britain's Collusion with Radical Islam

References

External links

A geostrategy for Eurasia, September/October 1997 Foreign Affairs
The Grand Chessboard  at Archive.org 

Foreign policy doctrines of the United States
Central Asia
Books about petroleum politics
Books about foreign relations of the United States
United States–Middle Eastern relations
United States–Asian relations
Non-fiction books about the Great Game
Books about geopolitics
1998 non-fiction books
Books about imperialism